Harrison Kanzler is a New Hampshire politician.

Career
On November 6, 2018, Kanzler was elected to the New Hampshire House of Representatives where he represents the Carroll 2 district. Kanzler assumed office on December 5, 2018. Kanzler is a Democrat.

Personal life
Kanzler resides in North Conway, New Hampshire. Kanzler is married and has one child.

References

Living people
People from North Conway, New Hampshire
Democratic Party members of the New Hampshire House of Representatives
21st-century American politicians
Year of birth missing (living people)